Timothy Joseph Urban (born May 1, 1989) is an American singer who was the seventh place finalist on the ninth season of American Idol. Following his participation in the series, he released two EPs: Heart of Me in 2010 and New York Sessions in 2014.

Early life
Urban was born in Tacoma, Washington, and is the sixth of ten children. His family moved to Duncanville, Texas when he was five. His siblings and he were all homeschooled by their mother, and two of his brothers have served in the military. Urban began to sing and learn the guitar when he was 13. Before auditioning for American Idol, he worked as a hotel and restaurant singer, and had a band. The group played regularly in the Dallas/Ft. Worth Christian music circuit, and also performed at Six Flags Over Texas twice. Urban has pointed to several diverse artists as his musical influences, including John Denver, Jack Johnson, John Mayer, OneRepublic, Jim Croce, James Taylor, Third Day, Michael Bublé, Coldplay, and Matt Nathanson.

Urban was a member of the talent-development agency Actors, Models and Talent for Christ (AMTC).

American Idol
Urban tried out for the ninth season of American Idol at the Dallas auditions, and sang "Bulletproof Weeks" by Matt Nathanson. Simon Cowell questioned the song choice, but felt that there was "more to come out of [Urban]." The judges sent Urban through to Hollywood Week, where he was shown during the first night, singing "Come Back to Me" by American Idol seventh-season winner David Cook. Simon and Kara DioGuardi both complimented the performance, although DioGuardi noted that it was "a little shaky." Urban was cut before the Top 24, but was called back after contestant Chris Golightly was disqualified from the competition for having lied about a past recording contract. Urban subsequently survived the semifinal eliminations and won a spot in the ninth's season top 10, securing a place on the 2010 American Idol summer concert tour. When he was asked by American Idol what his proudest moment was, he answered, "Handing out nutritional products to orphans in South Africa and Swaziland."

On the whole, Urban received a mixed reception from the judges, who praised a few of his performances, but regarded many of them as boring, "pedestrian" and "pointless and silly." But bloggers, often comparing him to Sanjaya Malakar from the sixth season, noted how the judges' criticisms never seemed to affect the perpetually smiling Urban—or his chances at being saved week after week. He was dubbed "Teflon Tim," a nickname to which host Ryan Seacrest alluded during the March 30 broadcast. "I don't think it makes any difference whatsoever what we say," quipped Simon Cowell the same night. "You're going to smile, the audience is going to vote for you, nobody cares, and you'll be here next week. So well done." As the controversy over Urban's lackluster performances grew, critics of the show began to fault the judges' commentary as "little more than displays of ego or thinly disguised bullying," and suggested Urban may be good for the show, because he put the judges in their place.

Vote for the Worst, a satirical Idol blog, supported Urban for his entire run during the season. The website claimed Urban held the record for the contestant to survive the longest with its endorsement, outlasting even Malakar. Urban later said about the blog, "I'm actually kind of sad that I was on that website."

Urban was eliminated during the "Idol Gives Back" special on April 21, after receiving unenthusiastic reviews for his performance of "Better Days" by Goo Goo Dolls, making him finish the competition in seventh place. A retrospect of Urban's run on Idol followed the announcement of his elimination. Then, presumably because the show ran long, it abruptly ended, without Urban even having a chance to sing a final song. Urban later said, "I was a little sad that I didn't get to sing one last time on that stage, but... you don't always get what you want. I'll be back for the finale and hopefully get to perform on that stage again. It was a little bittersweet, but overall, it's all right."

Performances 

 Because of the controversy over Chris Golightly's contract, Urban was brought back into the top 24.
 Urban was saved first from elimination.
 When Ryan Seacrest announced the results for this particular night, Urban was among the Bottom 3 but declared safe second, as Paige Miles was eliminated.
 When Ryan Seacrest announced the results for this particular night, Urban was among the Bottom 3 but declared safe second, as Didi Benami was eliminated.
 Due to the judges' using their one save to save Michael Lynche, the Top 9 remained intact for another week.

After Idol

Urban went on a media tour on local FOX affiliates, in addition to planned appearances on The Ellen DeGeneres Show, the Late Show with David Letterman, and The Wendy Williams Show. He has visited the If I Can Dream house. He was a part of the American Idols LIVE! Tour 2010, which started July 1, and ended on August 31, where he sang "Better Days" and "Viva la Vida". He also confirmed on MySpace that he will be releasing an EP. He then performed a live show during the half-time football game Duncanville High School vs Garland High School, wearing a Duncanville jersey. He was given the key to Duncanville and his own day "September 3" in his home town, Duncanville, at the game from the mayor.

On November 8, 2010, Urban began releasing a song a day to iTunes from his debut EP Heart of Me. On November 7, 2010, in a LIVE chat with the web site AiNow.org, he was said to be moving to California during the week of November 7, 2010, to work on his acting career and music, and is working on booking TV appearances to promote his album in California.

His first single, "Heart of Me", was released online November 7, 2010, and to iTunes on November 8, 2010. In the following days (in order) "Wheels Touch Down", "You and I", "P.S.", "Lullaby", and "Blur" were put up on iTunes.

On May 1, 2012, Urban released his first single, "Someday", from his upcoming debut album due for a 2012 release as a temporary free download and released the music video for the single in May 2012. He recently ran a Kickstarter campaign to raise money to record and release two new songs, "Perfectly You" and "Tears for Hallelujah." The new songs should be released around the beginning of 2014.

In 2014, Urban released his second EP, New York Sessions. Mark Franklin of the York Dispatch blog Idol Chatter gave New York Sessions a B and considered it a much superior work to Urban's first EP. Franklin wrote that New York Sessions convinced him of Urban's potential to record an impressive full-length album.

Discography

Extended plays

Singles

References

External links

 
 American Idol contestants page
 

1989 births
21st-century American guitarists
21st-century American male singers
21st-century American singers
American performers of Christian music
American male guitarists
American Idol participants
Living people
People from Duncanville, Texas
Singers from Texas
Guitarists from Texas